Enya is a Bantu language of the Democratic Republic of the Congo.

Maho (2009) lists D141 Zura (Zula) as most closely related.

References

Mbole-Enya languages
Languages of the Democratic Republic of the Congo